Lucknow Airpark formerly  was located adjacent to Lucknow, Ontario, Canada.

References

Defunct airports in Ontario